The Cathedral of the Immaculate Conception in Syracuse, New York is the mother church of the Roman Catholic Diocese of Syracuse. It is the seat of the Bishop of Syracuse, currently Douglas Lucia.

History

The church was initially constructed in 1874 by Lawrence J. O'Connor, and named Saint Mary's Church.  Formerly under the Diocese of Albany, the Diocese of Syracuse was created in 1887.  In 1904, Bishop Patrick Ludden selected Saint Mary's Church to become the new Cathedral.

Archimedes Russell, Architect was commissioned to expand the new Cathedral designing a new sanctuary and bell tower.  For this purpose, the Parish purchased the La Concha Turkish bath house, demolished it and built the Cathedral’s sanctuary.

Renamed The Cathedral of the Immaculate Conception, the new cathedral was consecrated in 1910.  For the dedication, Pope Leo XIII gave Bishop Ludden a brick taken from the Holy Door at St. Peter’s Basilica in Rome.  When Bishop Ludden died in 1912, he was buried in the Crypt beneath the Cathedral, where three other bishops and two monsignors are also buried.

Today
In addition to offering weekend and daily masses, the Cathedral supports the Cathedral Emergency Services, offering a downtown food pantry.

Amaus Health Services at The Cathedral of the Immaculate Conception, Syracuse, offers interim primary medical care and dental services to those who are marginalized from the health care system, serving the economically vulnerable and uninsured, especially the homeless.

The Cathedral features the Shrine of the Blessed Mother having a statue sculpted by LeMoyne College Professor Jacqueline Belfort-Chalat.

In 2013, in the area of the Sacred Heart Altar, a mosaic was installed depicting Saint Marianne Cope surrounded by her leper patients in Hawaii.  Custom made in Italy, it is 10 ft. by 5 ft.  Saint Marianne Cope, a Sister of Saint Francis, was raised and ministered much of her adult life in Central New York before going to Hawaii to care for the lepers (Hansen's Disease).

The Cathedral hosts local musicals and concerts performed by both area high schools, colleges, and professional groups. A selection of works by Herbert Howells played on the Cathedral’s 1892 Roosevelt-Schantz organ has been released on CD.

The Cathedral underwent a major renovation project during the spring and summer of 2017. It was rededicated on September 8, 2017. Cardinal Timothy Dolan of the Archdiocese of New York, along with Bishop Robert J. Cunningham, celebrated the re-dedication Mass.

See also
List of Catholic cathedrals in the United States
List of cathedrals in the United States
Roman Catholic Marian churches

References
 Diocese of Syracuse
 The Syracuse Post Standard; Picture Gallery
 The Cathedral of the Immaculate Conception
 Bishop Ludden Jr. Sr. High School; ©2005
 Zarex Corporation, ©1996-2002
 Syracuse Then and Now
 Cathedral Restoration Photos, Syracuse.com

External links

 Official Cathedral Site
 Diocese of Syracuse Official Site

Religious organizations established in 1830
Roman Catholic churches completed in 1874
Roman Catholic churches in Syracuse, New York
Immaculate Conception Syracuse
Roman Catholic Diocese of Syracuse
Gothic Revival church buildings in New York (state)
1830 establishments in New York (state)
19th-century Roman Catholic church buildings in the United States